Bienvenido Rodríguez García (March 21, 1927 – September 27, 2014) was a Puerto Rican outfielder in the Negro leagues.

A native of Santa Isabel, Puerto Rico, Rodríguez played for the Chicago American Giants in 1948. He died in Ponce, Puerto Rico in 2014 at age 87.

References

External links
 and Seamheads
 Bienvenido "Benny" Rodriguez at Negro League Baseball Players Association

1927 births
2014 deaths
Chicago American Giants players
20th-century African-American sportspeople
Baseball outfielders
People from Santa Isabel, Puerto Rico
21st-century African-American people